Beatrice "Bebe" Jane Neuwirth (born December 31, 1958) is an American actress, singer, and dancer. Known for her roles on stage and screen, she's received two Emmy Awards, two Tony Awards, and a Drama Desk Award.

Neuwirth made her Broadway debut in the musical A Chorus Line in 1980. She went on to receive two Tony Awards, the first for Best Featured Actress in a Musical playing Nickie in the revival of Sweet Charity (1986) and received her second for Best Actress in a Musical  for Velma Kelly in the revival of Chicago (1996). She has also starred as Lola in the revival of Damn Yankees (1994) and Morticia Addams in The Addams Family (2010).

On television, her breakthrough role was as Dr. Lilith Sternin, Frasier Crane's wife, on both the sitcom Cheers (in a starring role) and its spin-off Frasier (in a recurring guest role). The role won her two Primetime Emmy Awards for Outstanding Supporting Actress in a Comedy Series. Neuwirth was cast as Bureau Chief/ADA Tracey Kibre in NBC's Law & Order: Trial by Jury which ran for 2005 to 2006. She starred as Nadine Tolliver in the CBS political drama Madam Secretary from 2014 to 2017. She also appeared in Blue Bloods (2013-2019), and The Good Fight (2018-2021).

In film, she portrayed Nora Shepherd in the original Jumanji (1995) and Jumanji: The Next Level (2019). Other film roles include Say Anything... (1989), Green Card (1990), Bugsy (1991), Celebrity (1998), Summer of Sam (1999), and How to Lose a Guy in 10 Days (2003).

Early life
Neuwirth was born in Newark, New Jersey. Her father, Lee Neuwirth, was a mathematician who taught at Princeton University and also designed an encryption device while working at the Institute for Defense Analyses. Her mother, Sydney Anne Neuwirth, is a painter who also danced as an amateur for the Princeton Regional Ballet Company. She has an older brother Peter, a mathematician and actuary who graduated from Harvard. In her youth, Neuwirth rebelled against authority, being placed in custody for smoking marijuana when she was 13.

Neuwirth started taking ballet lessons at the age of five, a year after viewing a production of The Nutcracker with her mother. She desired to be a ballet dancer until her early teens, when she realized how restricted her technique was, as well as the standard of ballet education where she lived. Upon viewing the musical Pippin in Manhattan at 15, she changed her future plans from becoming a ballerina to being a Broadway musical dancer. After graduating from Princeton High School in 1976, she attended the Juilliard School for dance and left after only a year, disliking the school for having a "stifling creative environment" and no Broadway-style dance training. Immediately after leaving Juilliard in 1977, she took singing and jazz classes at a New York City-based YWCA, one of them taught by Joan Morton Lucas, who appeared in the film Singin' in the Rain (1952) and the original Broadway production of Kiss Me Kate. She performed with the Princeton Ballet Company in Peter and the Wolf, The Nutcracker, and Coppélia, also appearing in community theater musicals.

Career

Theater work

Studying acting for two years under Suzanne Shepard, Neuwirth made her Broadway debut in the role of Sheila in A Chorus Line in 1980. She later appeared in revivals of Little Me (1982); Sweet Charity (1986), for which she won a Tony Award for Best Featured Actress in a Musical; and Damn Yankees (1994).

1996 saw Neuwirth play Velma Kelly in the Broadway revival of Chicago. She described the difficulty level of the role as "like performing microsurgery from 8 to 10:20." That role brought her her greatest stage recognition to date and several awards including a Tony Award, Drama Desk Award and Outer Critics Circle Award for Best Leading Actress in a Musical. Neuwirth would later return to the revival of Chicago in 2006, this time as Roxie Hart. In 2014 she returned again, this time playing "Mama" Morton, making her the first person to play three different characters at three separate times during the course of a single Broadway run.

She appeared in the musical revue Here Lies Jenny which featured songs by Kurt Weill sung and danced by Neuwirth and a four-person supporting cast, as part of an unspoken ambiguous story in an anonymous seedy bar possibly in Berlin in the 1930s. The show ran from May 7 through October 3, 2004, in the Zipper Theater in New York. Here Lies Jenny was also presented by Neuwirth in San Francisco in 2005. In 2009, Neuwirth toured a one-woman cabaret show with pianist Scott Cady. The cabaret included music by Kurt Weill, Stephen Sondheim, Tom Waits, John Lennon, Paul McCartney, John Kander and Fred Ebb amongst others. In 2010, she returned to Broadway to create the role of Morticia Addams in the original production of The Addams Family opposite Nathan Lane.

In 2019, Neuwirth returned to the stage with the Philadelphia Theatre Company, appearing at the Suzanne Roberts Theater in Philadelphia.

Film and television
While in Los Angeles waiting to receive a Tony for her appearance in Sweet Charity in 1985, Neuwirth auditioned for the role of Dr. Lilith Sternin in the television series Cheers. At the time, Neuwirth was not interested in doing television work and her character was initially planned to be in only one episode of the series. However, the writers enjoyed writing her dialogue so much that she was written into more episodes of the show, eventually making her one of the series' recurring actors.

Neuwirth's character married Frasier Crane. From the fourth to the ninth season, Neuwirth portrayed Lilith in a regular recurring role, and she appeared on the show as a main star for both seasons ten and eleven. Like Kelsey Grammer when he started on the show as Frasier, she was not immediately given star billing in the opening credits but in the end credits for seasons eight and nine, appearing in the opening credits with her own portrait in seasons ten and eleven. She auditioned for the role with her arm in a sling, following a fall a week earlier. She won two Emmy Awards for the role, in 1990 and 1991. The character also made an appearance in the series Wings and in twelve episodes of the Cheers spin-off Frasier, which earned her a 1995 Emmy Award nomination as Outstanding Guest Actress in a Comedy Series. She left Cheers in 1993 to go back to her career in dancing, but would make more television appearances in other shows and commercials.

Neuwirth's dip into the film industry began in 1989 with small roles in films such as Say Anything... (1989), Pacific Heights (1990), and Penny Ante (1990). In 1990 she started doing supporting roles in films including Green Card (1990), Bugsy (1991), and Malice (1993), in all of which she received acclaim from critics for her performances. Her first lead role came in 1993, when she played a married woman attracted to one of her neighbors in the psychological thriller comedy film The Paint Job.

Her other credits include Jumanji, Summer of Sam, Liberty Heights, An Extremely Goofy Movie, The Adventures of Pinocchio, Tadpole, The Associate, How to Lose a Guy in 10 Days, The Big Bounce, Le Divorce, The Faculty, and Woody Allen's Celebrity. In 1996, she starred in a pilot for a TV series called Dear Diary for ABC which was not picked up. The producers had it edited slightly and put into a single theater for a single weekend in November 1996, and it became one of only two TV pilots to be nominated for an Oscar and the only one to win.

Other small-screen credits include a guest appearance in the second season of NewsRadio, a small role on The Adventures of Pete and Pete (episode: "The Call"), Deadline (2000), Hack (2003), Law & Order: Trial by Jury (2005) as ADA Tracey Kibre, Law & Order: Special Victims Unit (1999) as a modeling agent/suspect, the miniseries Wild Palms, and the fourth season Star Trek: The Next Generation episode "First Contact" as Lanel.

She appeared as herself in episodes of Will & Grace, Strangers with Candy and Celebrity Jeopardy!. In 2009, she co-starred as Ms. Kraft in the remake of Fame. She had a recurring role as Caroline, the literary editor of Jonathan Ames, on the HBO series Bored to Death. She also had a recurring role on Blue Bloods.

She starred as Nadine Tolliver in the 2014 CBS political drama Madam Secretary. In October 2017, Neuwirth announced her decision to leave the series after four seasons. No reason was given. She later reprised the role of Nora Shepherd in Jumanji: The Next Level in 2019; the film grossed 800 million dollars worldwide and received positive reviews from critics.

Personal life
In 1984, Neuwirth married Paul Dorman. She met him in 1982 after she performed a revue at O'Neal's restaurant in New York, where he was bartending. The two divorced in 1991. In 2009, she married director, producer and writer Chris Calkins at The Players club in Manhattan, in a ceremony officiated by actor Peter Coyote.

In a 2004 article in the newspaper J. The Jewish News of Northern California, she was reported as describing herself as Jewisha "plain Jew" with "no training". In a 2011 interview she said that she was an "atheist" who "believe[d] in unseen and unproved things" such as reincarnation.

Neuwirth has supported and worked for several non-profit charity organizations. Following two hip replacement surgeries, and after hearing stories of other dancers facing hip problems, Neuwirth was moved to establish the Dancers’ Resource program at The Actors Fund, which caters to financial and physical needs unique to professional dancers. Neuwirth currently serves as vice chair on the board of trustees for The Actors Fund. She has also helped Seeds of Peace.

As an animal lover, she has contributed to the Chatham, New York-based horse rescue group Equine Advocates and the annual pet adoption event Broadway Barks. Neuwirth is particularly fond of cats. In the 1990s, she owned one, Frankie, that she named after architect and writer Frank Lloyd Wright. As of August 2016, she had a black cat, Bobby, a long-haired calico cat, Tallulah, and a mixed Siamese cat, Billie.

In her free time, she enjoys pottery, which she first did in high school.

Filmography

Film

Television

Stage

Audiobooks

Awards and nominations

References

External links

 
 
 
 Bebe Neuwirth – Downstage Center interview at American Theatre Wing.org

Living people
20th-century American actresses
21st-century American actresses
Actresses from Newark, New Jersey
Jewish American atheists
American ballerinas
American contraltos
American film actresses
American musical theatre actresses
American television actresses
American voice actresses
Audiobook narrators
Jewish American actresses
Juilliard School alumni
Outstanding Performance by a Supporting Actress in a Comedy Series Primetime Emmy Award winners
People from Princeton, New Jersey
Princeton High School (New Jersey) alumni
Tony Award winners
Drama Desk Award winners
1958 births